Belince is a village and municipality in the Topoľčany District of the Nitra Region, Slovakia. In 2011 the village had 316 inhabitants.

Genealogical resources

The records for genealogical research are available at the state archive "Statny Archiv in Nitra, Slovakia"

 Roman Catholic church records (births/marriages/deaths): 1696-1896 (parish B)

See also
 List of municipalities and towns in Slovakia

External links
http://en.e-obce.sk/obec/belince/belince.html
http://www.belince.sk
Surnames of living people in Belince

Villages and municipalities in Topoľčany District